Guest Artist is a 2019 American drama film directed by Timothy Busfield and starring Jeff Daniels.  It is based on Daniels' play of the same name.

Cast
Jeff Daniels as Joseph Harris
Thomas Macias as Kenneth Waters
Richard McWilliams as Franz
Erika Slezak as Helen
McKara Bechler	as Hope
Dan Johnson as Dan
Lynch Travis as Larry
Ruth Crawford as Mary

References

External links
 
 

American drama films
American films based on plays
Films with screenplays by Jeff Daniels
2019 directorial debut films
2010s English-language films
2010s American films